"Feel So Numb" is a song recorded by American musician and film director Rob Zombie for his second studio album, The Sinister Urge (2001). The song was released through Geffen Records on October 14, 2001 as the lead single from the album. The Spanish intro sample "Prometo solemnemente defender el bien y luchar contra la injusticia y la maldad" translates as "I solemnly promise to defend good and fight against injustice and evil". This is taken from a 1966 Mexican movie, starring hall of fame luchador Mil Máscaras. The laughing at the beginning of the song is taken from the movie Horror Rises from the Tomb, The sound right after the laughing is from the movie I Drink Your Blood. Linda Miles of WWE used the song as an entrance theme for a short time in 2002, and it served as the theme song for WWE's No Way Out pay-per-view. The song also made an appearance on the Rollerball soundtrack and the 2006 video game FlatOut 2, along with the 2002 video game NHL Hitz 20-03.

Music video
The music video features the band playing in a club like place with various clips of "monsters". Sid Haig, Bill Moseley and Sheri Moon also appear briefly in the video.

Personnel
 Tom Baker - Mastering
 Scott Humphrey - Producer, Programming, Mixing
 Blasko - Bass
 Riggs - Guitar
 Tempesta - Drums
 Rob Zombie - Vocals, Lyricist, Producer, Music, Art Direction

Chart positions

References

Rob Zombie songs
2001 singles
2001 songs
Songs written by Rob Zombie
Songs written by Scott Humphrey
Geffen Records singles